William Henry Read (1 October 1885 – 1951) was an English professional footballer who played as a winger for Sunderland.

References

1885 births
1951 deaths
People from Blackpool
English footballers
Association football wingers
Lytham F.C. players
Blackpool F.C. players
Colne F.C. players
Sunderland A.F.C. players
Chelsea F.C. players
Dundee F.C. players
Swansea City A.F.C. players
Chesterfield F.C. players
English Football League players